The Fermat prize of mathematical research biennially rewards research works in fields where the contributions of Pierre de Fermat have been decisive:

 Statements of variational principles
 Foundations of probability and analytic geometry
 Number theory. 

The spirit of the prize is focused on rewarding the results of research accessible to the greatest number of professional mathematicians within these fields. The Fermat prize was created in 1989 and is awarded once every two years in Toulouse by the Institut de Mathématiques de Toulouse. The amount of the Fermat prize has been fixed at 20,000 Euros for the twelfth edition (2011).

Previous prize winners

Pierre Fermat medal
There has also been a Pierre Fermat medal, which has been awarded for example to chemist Linus Pauling (1957), mathematician Ernst Peschl (1965) and botanist Francis Raymond Fosberg.

Junior Fermat Prize 

The Junior Fermat Prize is a mathematical prize, awarded every two years to a student in the first four years of university for a contribution to mathematics. The amount of the prize is 2000 Euros.

See also

 List of mathematics awards

References

External links 
 Fermat Prize official web site 
 Junior Fermat Prize official web site  
 Annales de la faculté des sciences de Toulouse

Mathematics awards
Awards established in 1989
Variational principles
.